Toshinao is a masculine Japanese given name.

Possible writings
Toshinao can be written using different combinations of kanji characters. Some examples:

敏直, "agile, frankness"
敏尚, "agile, still"
敏猶, "agile, furthermore"
俊直, "talented, frankness"
俊尚, "talented, still"
俊猶, "talented, furthermore"
利直, "benefit, frankness"
利尚, "benefit, still"
利猶, "benefit, furthermore"
年直, "year, frankness"
年尚, "year, still"
寿直, "long life, frankness"
寿尚, "long life, still"

The name can also be written in hiragana としなお or katakana トシナオ.

Notable people with the name
Toshinao Nakagawa (中川 俊直, born 1970), Japanese politician.
Toshinao Nanbu (南部 利直, 1576–1632), Japanese samurai and daimyō.
Toshinao Sasaki (佐々木 俊尚, born 1961), Japanese journalist.
Toshinao Tomie (富江 利直, born 1910), Japanese middle-distance runner.
Toshinao Urabe (卜部 敏直, born 1950), Japanese diplomat.

Japanese masculine given names